Božidar Đelić (born 1 April 1965) is a Serbian economist and former politician. A longtime member of the Democratic Party, he was highly positioned in politics of Serbia after the overthrow of Slobodan Milošević. He served as the Minister of Finance and Economy in the Government of Serbia from 2001 to 2004 and later as Deputy Prime Minister of Serbia and Minister of Science and Technological Development from 2007 to 2011.

Early life and education
Đelić was born in Belgrade in 1965, an only child. His parents divorced soon after his birth and went abroad in search of better prospects, while he stayed behind in Belgrade where he was raised by his maternal grandparents. He later described his grandmother Mileva as the strongest figure in his childhood. When his grandparents died in 1973, he moved to Paris to live with his mother and stepfather in Paris. When her small business collapsed, Božidar helped earn his way by washing dishes and cleaning windows, while studying at the same time.

In 1980 and 1981, Đelić won the French national competitions (Lauréat du Concours général) for high-school students in geography and economics. He graduated from the SciencesPo (Institut d’Etudes Politiques) in 1987, as top 5% of a class of 800 students.

In 1987, he obtained HEC (Hautes Etudes Commerciales) diploma at "Jouy-en-Josas", where he specialized in strategy and finance. In 1988, he obtained MA in Economics (Diplôme d’Etudes Approfondies) at "Ecole des Hautes Etudes en Sciences Sociales", with thesis on the "effects of real exchange rate instability on growth in emerging countries".

With two scholarships given, in 1991 he graduated from the J.F. Kennedy School of Government, at Harvard University, where he obtained MPA (Master of Public Administration) title. Also, in the same year, he obtained MBA (Master of Business Administration) from the Harvard Business School in Boston, specialized in finance and marketing.

Career

In 2001, he was appointed as the Minister of Finance and Economy in the Government of Serbia led by Zoran Đinđić. Đinđić was assassinated on 12 March 2003, and Zoran Živković took over the Government of Serbia.

In May 2004, he was appointed as the member of the General Management Committee of French financial institution Crédit Agricole.

From 2007 to 2011, Đelić served as the Deputy Prime Minister of Serbia, as well as the Minister for Science and Technological Development from 2008 to 2011. During that period he was chief negotiator for Serbia's accession to the European Union. He was also the chief governor of Serbia in relation to the World Bank Group and Deputy Governor to the EBRD. In December 2011, he resigned from the governmental office, stating failure to get country's candidate status for EU accession.

In January 2014, Đelić joined the French investment bank Lazard based in Paris, France.

Notes

References

External links

 Official web-site

1965 births
Living people
Deputy Prime Ministers of Serbia
Finance ministers of Serbia
Democratic Party (Serbia) politicians
Harvard Business School alumni
McKinsey & Company people
Politicians from Belgrade
20th-century Serbian economists
Harvard Kennedy School alumni
Social Democratic Party (Serbia) politicians